Farley Drexel Hatcher (A.K.A. "Fudge") is a fictional character in several novels by Judy Blume. In the television series Fudge, he was played by Luke Tarsitano.

Character

Life

Farley Drexel Hatcher was born in New York, and is the younger of two sons of Warren and Anne Hatcher. Nicknamed Fudge early in his life, Fudge is 7 years younger than his older brother, Peter. He also has a younger sister named Tootsie.

Ideas, interests and obsessions
 Tales of a Fourth Grade Nothing - wanting to fly, mimicking a dog, believing that the bears shown in a documentary film he, Peter and Warren watch at the theater are real.
 Superfudge - being a bird, Uncle Feather (his pet Myna Bird), pretending to believe in Santa Claus, being a superhero.
 Fudge-a-Mania - marrying Sheila Tubman, birds, dinosaurs, spinning in circles repeatedly, being a bird breeder.
 Double Fudge - money, various ways to spend money, expensive toys and play structures.

See also

 List of Fudge series characters
 Tales of a Fourth Grade Nothing
 Superfudge
 Fudge-a-Mania
 Double Fudge

References

External links
 Fudge website

Literary characters introduced in 1972
Characters in American novels of the 20th century
Child characters in literature